Simon P. Cox (born 20 March 1952) is a Welsh professional golfer and coach.

After a successful amateur career which included representing Wales and Great Britain and winning the Welsh Amateur Championship, he turned professional in 1975, playing on the PGA European Tour and competing in tournaments worldwide.

Among the highlights of a professional career that saw him compete across Australia, New Zealand, South America and Africa, he represented Wales in the 1975 Golf World Cup in Thailand. He also won the Welsh Professional Championship on two occasions.

Professional wins
1976 Welsh Professional Championship
1983 Welsh Professional Championship

Team appearances
Amateur
European Amateur Team Championship (representing Wales): 1971, 1973

Professional
World Cup (representing Wales): 1975
Double Diamond International (representing Wales): 1977

References

Living people
Welsh male golfers
European Tour golfers
1952 births